Senator Holcomb may refer to:

David Holcomb (fl. 1960s–1970s), Ohio State Senate
Marcus H. Holcomb (1844–1932), Connecticut State Senate